JDStar (also spelt Jd'), was a women's professional wrestling promotion based in Tokyo, Japan. In the wake of the joshi puroresu boom of the early 1990s, several different groups opened with distinct approaches. The Jd'Star promotion, with its subtitle, "Beauty Athlete," summed up the company's approach.

History
Jaguar Yokota came out of retirement and announced the formation of her promotion, JDStar, at a press conference, in 1995. In the beginning, she was the focal point of most of their shows. She left the promotion in 1998,  After her departure, JDStar was bought by Kiyu Uji.

The company had a nice roster, but none with the ability or personalities to attract much attention. In 2001, Hidenobu Ichimaru bought JDStar from Kiyu Uji, and establish a new gimmick to promote JDStar's talent: the "athtress" (athlete-actress), which used girls with model good looks to market them for their athleticism in the pro wrestling ring, and hopefully establish them as actresses.

Coming mainly from an acting background, the first run of girls had few skills, and the fanfare dropped slightly. The "athtress" gimmick however, created more controversy than anything and the attempt to create an idol never quite caught on. Also dropping was the wrestlers' respect for Ichimaru, as several of the established wrestlers in joshi puroresu thought that the "athtresses" should not be in the same ring as them.

JDStar continued to flounder before ultimately folding in the summer of 2007.

Roster
JD' moulded the careers of several new wrestlers with Uji in charge, including The Bloody, Fang Suzuki, and Sumie Sakai, who is also well known for wrestling for several independent promotions on the American east coast.

The second run of Athtresses was the most famous group, featuring Emi Tojo, Yumi Ohka, Kei Akiyama and Asami Kawasaki. JDStar also moved into its home building, Shin-Kiba 1st Ring, later that year, and sold it out on their first show.  The biggest surprise came in May of that year when Jaguar Yokota came back to the promotion, teaming with Lioness Asuka against Yumi Ohka and Emi Tojo, and picking up the win over Ohka. The third run of the Athtress program was its last, and Fuka and Shuu Shibutani were the last two girls to run through the program.  Both have seen much fanfare and success, with Shu becoming a popular wrestler through her training with Mariko Yoshida's Ibuki group, which showcases the best young talents that Japan has to offer. Early in 2007, another rookie, Misaki Ohata, debuted with the promotion. She was trained by Yoshida throughout 2006.

Championships

JDStar

American Wrestling Federation

Trans World Federation

Other

References

External links

 JDStar Official Website (Japanese)

Japanese women's professional wrestling promotions
Professional wrestling schools
2007 establishments in Japan